Bannikoppa is a village in the Koppal district of Karnataka state, India.

Demographics
Per the 2011 Census of India, Bannikoppa has a total population of 2707; of whom 1363 are male and 1344 female.

See also
Lakkundi
Halligudi
Kuknoor
Koppal

References

Villages in Koppal district